Lotfi Abdelli (born March 14, 1970, in Tunis) is a Tunisian actor and comedian.

Biography 
Lotfi Abdelli started his artistic career as a dancer in Tunis Conservatory, under the direction of Anne-Marie Sellami, and then in the ballet of the National Theatre of Tunisia, under the direction of Mohamed Driss, also in the Tunisian national ballet, under the direction of Odile Cougoule (Histoires d'elles show in 1991), Nawel Skandrani and Imed Jemâa in her company, the Dance Theater. He participated as a dancer in the show of Hadhra by Fadhel Jaziri.

In film acting, he won the award of best performance by an actor in the Carthage Film Festival of 2006 for his role in the film Making Of by Nouri Bouzid.

In August 2012, his one-man show 100% Hallal was cancelled by salafist protesters, who claimed they wanted to pray in the room that was reserved for the show as a way of disrupting it.

In June 2015, he presented the show Chich Bich on the Attessia TV channel. He took advantage to be reconciled with Samir Dilou three years later, an altercation with him on the show Sans éloge on Hannibal TV.

In 2015 and 2016, Abdelli received the award of the best comedian for his role in Bolice and the award of the Ramadan star in Romdhane Awards, organized by Mosaïque FM.

In December 2015, he won the prize for best actor for his performance in Farès Naânaâ's film Les Frontières du ciel at the twelfth Dubai International Film Festival.

In September 2017, Abdelli opened a tea room. And then in December he launched a new television show called Abdelli ShowTime broadcast on the Attessia TV channel. In June 2019 he announced that he wants to become a shareholder in the channel.

In 2019, Lotfi created his one-man show Just Abdelli 100% Tabou.

Cinema

Feature films

Medium-length films 
 2008 : Penalty (Dharbet Jazzaa) by Nouri Bouzid

Short films

Television

TV series

TV shows

Theater 
 2006 : Borj Eddalou by Taoufik El Ayeb
 2009 : Made in Tunisia by Chedly Arfaoui
 2015 : Abdelli Best Of Show
 2019 : Just Abdelli 100% Tabou by Rabi Tekali

References

External links 
 

1970 births
Living people
Tunisian male television actors
Tunisian male film actors
Tunisian male stage actors
People from Tunis